“The World in 2050” was a global futurist writing contest co-sponsored by The Economist magazine and Royal Dutch Shell. It carried a first prize of $20,000, which included publication of the winning piece in The Economist’s annual flagship publication, “The World In”.
Entries were accepted from around the world via a website set up for the purpose, worldin2050.com, and at various Royal Dutch Shell offices worldwide. 
The judging panel was chaired by Richard O’Brien, co-founder of Outsights, a scenario planning consultancy, and included:
 Bill Emmott, author and then-editor of The Economist
 Esther Dyson, an angel investor and philanthropist 
 Sir Mark Moody-Stuart, then-chairman of Royal Dutch Shell 
 Matt Ridley, a British scientist and member of the House of Lords
 Peter Warshall, an ecologist, activist and former editor of the Whole Earth Catalog and Whole Earth magazine

Over 3,000 entries were submitted from 75 countries, and the $20,000 first prize was awarded to Bill Douglass, an American student. Two second prizes of $10,000 each and five $5,000 third prizes were also awarded.

References

Writing contests
Fiction set in 2050
The Economist
Shell plc